Benjamin Abadiano (born February 11, 1963) is a Filipino lexicographer who has worked in the country's highlands with the Mangyan, Lumad, and other indigenous peoples. He did volunteer work for nine years in Paitan, Oriental Mindoro, and later in Mindanao. He was awarded the 2004 Ramon Magsaysay Award for Emergent Leadership.

Abadiano compiled the first Tagalog-Mangyan dictionary.

Abadiano started the forum Advocacy Photographers in 2009.

He is currently the President of the Assisi Development Foundation, Inc.

References 

1963 births
Living people
Ramon Magsaysay Award winners
Linguists from the Philippines